Newham London Borough Council  is the local authority for the London Borough of Newham. It is a London borough council, one of 32 in the United Kingdom capital of London. The council is unusual in that its executive function is controlled by a directly elected mayor of Newham, currently Rokhsana Fiaz. The council was created by the London Government Act 1963 and replaced four local authorities: East Ham Borough Council, West Ham Borough Council, Barking Borough Council and Woolwich Metropolitan Borough Council.

History

There have previously been a number of local authorities responsible for the Newham area. The current local authority was first elected in 1964, a year before formally coming into its powers and prior to the creation of the London Borough of Newham on 1 April 1965. Newham replaced East Ham Borough Council, West Ham Borough Council, Barking Borough Council (for land west of the River Roding) and Woolwich Metropolitan Borough Council (for land north of the River Thames). West Ham was a county borough (which meant that its council had the functions of both a county and a borough) from 1889 and East Ham gained that status in 1915. It was previously a non-county borough and between 1894 and 1904 it was governed by East Ham Urban District Council. Before 1900 Woolwich was governed by the Woolwich Local Board of Health. Barking was governed by Barking Town Urban District Council from 1894 to 1931. Local boards were formed for Woolwich in 1852, West Ham in 1856, East Ham in 1878 and Barking Town in 1882.

It was envisaged that through the London Government Act 1963 Newham as a London local authority would share power with the Greater London Council. The split of powers and functions meant that the Greater London Council was responsible for "wide area" services such as fire, ambulance, flood prevention, and refuse disposal; with the local authorities responsible for "personal" services such as social care, libraries, cemeteries and refuse collection. As an outer London borough council it has been an education authority since 1965. This arrangement lasted until 1986 when Newham London Borough Council gained responsibility for some services that had been provided by the Greater London Council, such as waste disposal. Since 2000 the Greater London Authority has taken some responsibility for highways and planning control from the council, but within the English local government system the council remains a "most purpose" authority in terms of the available range of powers and functions.

Powers and functions
The local authority derives its powers and functions from the London Government Act 1963 and subsequent legislation, and has the powers and functions of a London borough council. It sets council tax and as a billing authority also collects precepts for Greater London Authority functions and business rates. It sets planning policies which complement Greater London Authority and national policies, and decides on almost all planning applications accordingly.  It is a local education authority  and is also responsible for council housing, social services, libraries, waste collection and disposal, traffic, and most roads and environmental health.

Lender option borrower option loans
Newham London Borough Council has £563 million of long term lender option borrower option loans (LOBOs), more than anywhere else in the country. It pays annual interest of up to 7.6%.

Summary results of elections
 
The council has been controlled by the Labour Party since it was first elected in 1964.

References

Local authorities in London
London borough councils
Politics of the London Borough of Newham
Mayor and cabinet executives
Local education authorities in England
Billing authorities in England